Winfield R-IV School District is a school district headquartered in Winfield, Missouri.

Schools
 Winfield High School
 Winfield Middle School
 Winfield Intermediate School
 Winfield Primary School

References

External links
 

School districts in Missouri
Education in Lincoln County, Missouri